The LIU Sharks men's basketball team represents Long Island University in NCAA Division I basketball competition. They play their home games at their Brooklyn Campus in the Steinberg Wellness Center and Barclays Center, formerly known as the Wellness, Recreation & Athletics Center, and are members of the Northeast Conference. Their current head coach is Rod Strickland who was hired in June 2022.

The LIU Sharks are the result of the July 1, 2019 unification of the athletic departments which had previously represented two separate campuses of LIU, the Division I LIU Brooklyn Blackbirds and the Division II LIU Post Pioneers.

History
Following Long Island University's founding in 1927, it soon entered intercollegiate athletic competition. Initially, its sports teams wore blue uniforms and became known as the Blue Devils. In 1935, a Brooklyn Eagle reporter saw the basketball team in its new black uniforms and stated that the team looked like blackbirds, and a new nickname was born.

LIU was a national basketball powerhouse in the 1930s and 1940s under Clair Bee, who compiled the highest winning percentage in major college basketball history, and the 1935–36 team was retroactively recognized as the pre-NCAA tournament national champion by the Premo-Porretta Power Poll. 

After several players were implicated in the point-shaving scandal of 1951, LIU shuttered its entire athletic program. It returned to the College Division (now Division II) in 1957 as the LIU Brooklyn Blackbirds.

Blackbirds

The LIU Brooklyn Blackbirds men's basketball team represented the Brooklyn campus LIU in Division II from 1957. The Blackbirds were members of the Northeast Conference. The team first returned to the University Division (the predecessor to Division I) in the late 1960s. They finally returned to Division I in the 1980s. At the same time as the Blackbirds returned, LIU's C.W. Post College Pioneers began competing, in the College Division with the school being renamed LIU Post in 2012.

Their final head coach was Derek Kellogg, who was hired after his firing from Massachusetts in 2017, with the 2017–18 season was his first as head coach. On March 12, 2013, the team achieved what was the greatest run in Northeast Conference history with a third straight NCAA Tournament bid.

In October 2018, LIU announced that it would merge its two existing athletic programs—the LIU Brooklyn Blackbirds and LIU Post Pioneers, the latter an NCAA Division II member—effective with the 2019–20 school year. The merged athletic program now competes as the LIU Sharks, with the new colors of blue and gold, with Kellogg becoming the Sharks' first head men's basketball coach.

Blackbirds Postseason

NCAA Division I Tournament results
The Blackbirds appeared in the NCAA Division I tournament seven times. Their combined record was 0–7.

NCAA Division II tournament results
The Blackbirds appeared in the NCAA Division II tournament three times. Their combined record was 6–3.

NIT results
The Blackbirds appeared in the National Invitation Tournament (NIT) ten times. Their combined record was 7–8 and they were NIT champions in 1939 and 1941.

Rivalry

For 44 years, beginning in the 1975–1976 season, an annual Battle of Brooklyn has been a tradition for LIU Brooklyn Blackbirds and St. Francis Brooklyn Terriers men's basketball teams. Each season, a game (the schools usually play each other twice) is dedicated in tribute William Lai and Daniel Lynch, former athletic directors at Long Island University and St. Francis College, respectively. The Battle of Brooklyn has been a tradition between the basketball programs for 40 years. Each year the most valuable player of the game is given the Lai-Lynch Trophy in memory of the two ADs. Long Island now has a Battle record of 23–17 against St. Francis.

Notable players
 Barry Leibowitz (born 1945), American-Israeli basketball player
 Charles Jones (born 1975), American basketball player

References

External links
 Official website